Attila Szilvássy (born 21 January 1965) is a Hungarian sailor. He competed in the Finn event at the 1992 Summer Olympics.

References

External links
 

1965 births
Living people
Hungarian male sailors (sport)
Olympic sailors of Hungary
Sailors at the 1992 Summer Olympics – Finn
Sportspeople from Budapest